The Battle of the Lipari Islands or Battle of Lipara was a naval encounter fought in 260 BC during the First Punic War. A squadron of 20 Carthaginian ships commanded by Boödes surprised 17 Roman ships under the senior consul for the year Gnaeus Cornelius Scipio in Lipara Harbour. The inexperienced Romans made a poor showing, with all 17 of their ships captured, along with their commander.

The Romans had recently built a fleet in order to contest the Carthaginians' maritime control of the western Mediterranean and Scipio had impetuously ventured to the Liparas with the advance squadron. The battle was little more than a skirmish, but is notable as the first naval encounter of the Punic Wars and the first time Roman warships had engaged in battle. The Romans went on to win the two, larger, naval encounters that followed and establish a rough sea-going parity.

Primary sources
The main source for almost every aspect of the First Punic War is the historian Polybius ( –  118 BC), a Greek sent to Rome in 167 BC as a hostage. His works include a now-lost manual on military tactics, but he is best known for his work The Histories, written sometime after 146 BC, or about a century after the battle. Polybius's work is considered broadly objective and largely neutral as between Carthaginian and Roman points of view.

Carthaginian written records were destroyed along with their capital, Carthage, in 146 BC and so Polybius's account of the First Punic War is based on several, now-lost, Greek and Latin sources. Polybius was an analytical historian and wherever possible personally interviewed participants in the events he wrote about. Only the first book of the 40 comprising The Histories deals with the First Punic War. The accuracy of Polybius's account has been much debated over the past 150 years, but the modern consensus is to accept it largely at face value, and the details of the battle in modern sources are almost entirely based on interpretations of Polybius's account. The modern historian Andrew Curry considers that "Polybius turns out to [be] fairly reliable"; while Dexter Hoyos describes him as "a remarkably well-informed, industrious, and insightful historian". Other, later, histories of the war exist, but in fragmentary or summary form, and they usually cover military operations on land in more detail than those at sea. Modern historians usually also take into account the later histories of Diodorus Siculus and Dio Cassius, although the classicist Adrian Goldsworthy states that "Polybius' account is usually to be preferred when it differs with any of our other accounts".

Other sources include inscriptions, archaeological evidence, and empirical evidence from reconstructions such as the trireme Olympias. Since 2010 a number of artefacts have been recovered from the site of the Battle of the Aegates, the final battle of the war, fought nineteen years later. Their analysis and the recovery of further items are ongoing.

Background

Operations in Sicily

The First Punic War between Carthage and Rome broke out in 264BC. Carthage was a well-established maritime power in the western Mediterranean; Rome had recently unified mainland Italy south of the River Arno under its control. The immediate cause of the war was control of the Sicilian town of Messana (modern Messina). More broadly both sides wished to control Syracuse, the most powerful city-state on Sicily. By 260 BC the war had lasted four years, and the Romans had pushed forward into Sicily, with a number of successes, including the capture of Agrigentum, an important Carthaginian base. However, the Carthaginian navy repeatedly raided the Romans' rear areas and even the coast of Italy. Their control of the sea also made it impossible for the Romans to successfully blockade those Carthaginian cities which were on the coast. The Carthaginians were engaging in their traditional policy of waiting for their opponents to wear themselves out, in the expectation of then regaining some or all of their possessions and negotiating a mutually satisfactory peace treaty.

Ships

During this war the standard warship was the quinquereme, meaning "five-oared". The galley expert John Coates suggested they could maintain  for extended periods. Vessels were built as cataphract, or "protected", ships, with a closed hull and a full deck able to carry embarked legionaries as marines and catapults. They had a separate "oar box" attached to the main hull which contained the rowers. These features allowed the hull to be strengthened, increased carrying capacity and improved conditions for the rowers.

In 260 BC the Romans set out to construct a fleet and used a shipwrecked Carthaginian quinquereme as a blueprint for their own. As novice shipwrights, the Romans built copies that were heavier than the Carthaginian vessels, which made them slower and less manoeuvrable. The quinquereme was the workhorse of the Roman and Carthaginian fleets throughout the Punic Wars, so ubiquitous that Polybius uses it as a shorthand for "warship" in general. A quinquereme carried a crew of 300, of which 280 were oarsmen and 20 deck crew and officers; it would normally also carry a complement of 40 marines, and if battle was thought to be imminent, this would be increased to as many as 120.

Getting the oarsmen to row as a unit, as well as execute more complex battle manoeuvres, required long and arduous training. At least half of the oarsmen would need to have had some experience if the ship was to be handled effectively. As a result, the Romans were initially at a disadvantage against the more experienced Carthaginians. All warships were equipped with a ram, a triple set of  bronze blades weighing up to  positioned at the waterline. They were made individually by the lost-wax method to fit immovably to a galley's prow and secured with bronze spikes. In the century prior to the Punic Wars, boarding had become increasingly common and ramming had declined, as the larger and heavier vessels adopted in this period lacked the speed and manoeuvrability necessary to ram, while their sturdier construction reduced the ram's effect even in the case of a successful attack.

Battle
It was the long-standing Roman procedure to elect two men each year, known as consuls, to each lead their military forces. The patrician Gnaeus Cornelius Scipio, the year's senior consul, was given command of the fleet. He put to sea with the first 17 ships produced. As the first-ever Roman warships they spent some time training in home waters before sailing to Messana. There they prepared for the main fleet's arrival and supported the logistics of the Roman army at the sea crossing to Sicily.

While Scipio was at the Strait of Messina he received information that the garrison of the city of Lipara was willing to defect to the Roman side. Lipara was the main port of the Lipari Islands and was a constant threat to Roman communications across the Strait. Though his crews were still inexperienced and the newly designed and built ships were still undergoing their sea trials, the consul could not resist the temptation of conquering an important city without a fight and sailed to Lipara. It has been suggested by some ancient sources that the offer to surrender Lipara was a ruse inspired by Carthage to encourage the Romans to commit their ships where they could be ambushed, but the sources do not give much detail and are usually pro-Roman.

The Romans entered the harbour at Lipara. When he heard of the Romans' advance to Lipara he despatched 20 ships under Boödes, a Carthaginian aristocrat, to the town. The Carthaginians arrived at night and trapped the Romans in the harbour. Boödes led his ships in an attack on the Romans inside the harbour the next morning. Scipio's men offered little resistance. The inexperienced crews were no match for the well-drilled Carthaginians and were rapidly outfought. Some Romans panicked and fled inland and the consul himself was taken prisoner, along with many of the other Roman senior officers. Some later accounts have Scipio treacherously captured while parleying, but this is probably a Roman fabrication. All of the Roman ships were captured, most with little damage. The battle was little more than a skirmish, but is notable as the first naval encounter of the Punic Wars and the first time Roman warships had engaged in battle.

Aftermath

Scipio was later released, probably ransomed. His easy defeat earned him the pejorative cognomen , which means donkey in Latin. This cognomen was all the more insulting because "asina" was the feminine form of the word donkey, as opposed to the masculine form "asinus". In spite of this Scipio's career prospered and he was consul for a second time in 254 BC.

Shortly after the Lipara victory, Hannibal Gisco was scouting with 50 Carthaginian ships when he encountered the full Roman fleet. He escaped, but lost most of his ships. This allowed marines to more easily board enemy ships and capture them.

Later the same year Scipio's fellow consul, Gaius Duilius, placed the Roman army units under subordinates and took command of the fleet. He promptly sailed, seeking battle. The two fleets met off the coast of Mylae in the Battle of Mylae. Hannibal Gisco had 130 ships, and the historian John Lazenby calculates that Duilius had approximately the same number. Using the  the Romans captured 50 Carthaginian vessels and dealt the Carthaginians a sharp defeat.

The war was to last for another 19 years before ending in a Carthaginian defeat and a negotiated peace. Thereafter Rome was the leading military power in the western Mediterranean, and increasingly the Mediterranean region as a whole. The Romans had built more than 1,000 galleys during the war, and this experience of building, manning, training, supplying, and maintaining such numbers of ships laid the foundation for Rome's maritime dominance for 600 years.

Notes, citations and sources

Notes

Citations

Sources

Further reading
 

Lipari Islands
Lipari Islands
the Lipari Islands
Lipari Islands
Lipari Islands
Lipari Islands